Japan competed at the 2022 World Aquatics Championships in Budapest, Hungary from 18 June to 3 July. 58 competitors took part in all 5 sports held at the championships; artistic swimming, open water swimming, swimming,  diving, and water polo.

Medalists 

| width=78% align=left valign=top |

Artistic Swimming 

Japan entered 13 artistic swimmers. 

Women

Mixed

Diving 

Japan entered 9 divers.
 

Men

Women

Mixed

Open water swimming 

Japan entered 7 open water swimmers ( 3 male  and 4 female)
 
Men

Women

Mixed

Swimming 

Japan entered 18 swimmers.

Men

Women

Mixed

Water polo 

 
Summary

Men's tournament

Team roster

Group play

Playoffs

9–12th place semifinals

Ninth place game

References 

Nations at the 2022 World Aquatics Championships
2022 in Japanese sport
2022